Baalke may refer to:

 Trent Baalke, General Manager of the Jacksonville Jaguars
 6524 Baalke, an asteroid
 Baalke Slough, a lake in Valley County, Montana